Hickling Priory was an Augustinian priory located in Norfolk, England.

The house was founded in 1185 by Theobald, grandson of Theobald de Valognes, Lord of Parham. By 1291 the Priory had possession of thirty two Norfolk parishes and held an annual three-day All Hallows fair at Hacheston in Suffolk, close to the founders' estate at Parham.

The Plague killed all but two of its brethren and the house never fully recovered, being cited repeatedly thereafter by episcopal authorities for deteriorated buildings and lax observance by the canons.

The Visitations by the Bishops of Norwich shed some light on the Priory's last years.

The Priory acknowledged the king's supremacy on 4 June 1534. The Valor of 1535 gave its value as £100 with their most valuable possession being the nearby manor of Hickling. The house was dissolved in 1536.

Today ruined portions of the church and claustral buildings survive on the privately owned Priory Farm in Hickling.

See also
List of monastic houses in Norfolk
List of monastic houses in England

References

External links
Entertainments at Hickling Priory, Norfolk: 1510-1520

Monasteries in Norfolk
Augustinian monasteries in England
1185 establishments in England
Christian monasteries established in the 12th century
1536 disestablishments in England
Hickling, Norfolk